The 1959 Idaho State Bengals football team was an American football team that represented Idaho State University as a member of the Rocky Mountain Conference (RMC) during the 1959 NCAA College Division football season.  In their fourth season under head coach Babe Caccia, the Bengals compiled a 6–2 record (4–0 against conference opponents), won the RMC championship, and outscored opponents by a total of 160 to 79. The team captains were Paul Tripp and Ray Konczos.

Schedule

References

Idaho State
Idaho State Bengals football seasons
Rocky Mountain Athletic Conference football champion seasons
Idaho State Bengals football